William Balmer McAllister was an Ontario businessman and political figure. He represented Renfrew North in the Legislative Assembly of Ontario from 1882 to 1883 as a Conservative member.

He was born in Eardley Township, Ottawa County. He married Maria Stewart. McAllister was a miller and lumber merchant in Pembroke. He served on the municipal council and school board. In 1882, he was elected to a seat in the provincial assembly by acclamation after Thomas Murray resigned his seat to contest the seat in the federal parliament. McAllister operated Pembroke's first electric light plant which was located on the Muskrat River and he later became a shareholder in the Pembroke Electric Light Company, formed in 1889. With J. H. Metcalfe, McAllister staked a large mining claim in Copper Cliff which they sold to the Canadian Copper Company (later Inco) for $1,200. He was also president of the Pembroke Southern Railway.

External links 

The Canadian parliamentary companion, 1883, JA Gemmill
Pioneering on the C.P.R., FR Howey (1938)

Progressive Conservative Party of Ontario MPPs
People from Pembroke, Ontario